Mega Man ZX is an action platform game developed by Inti Creates and published by Capcom for Nintendo DS. It was released on July 6, 2006 in Japan, September 12, 2006 in North America, June 20, 2007 in Australia, and June 22, 2007 in Europe.  

Part of the Mega Man franchise, ZX is set two hundred years after the events of the Mega Man Zero series, and revolves around the efforts of the protagonist to recover powerful ancient artifacts called "Biometals" from the Pseudoroids, evil robots made to harness their power. The game introduces a new open-ended gameplay environment and the ability to select the protagonist's gender, a first in the series.

The game received positive reviews from critics, who praised its gameplay and level design, but were divided about its high difficulty level. A sequel, Mega Man ZX Advent, was released the following year, in 2007. The game was later re-released in February 2020 as part of the Mega Man Zero/ZX Legacy Collection for PlayStation 4, Xbox One, Nintendo Switch, and Microsoft Windows.

Plot

Setting 
In the year 25XX, humans and Reploids - sentient androids initially created by Dr. Cain prior to Mega Man X - now coexist peacefully, successfully restoring Earth's former nations thanks to the technological efforts of Slither Inc. However, the peace is disrupted by several incidents of Reploids mysteriously going Maverick. Trading between nations became obstructed, forcing the nations to separate into utopian cities.

To repel the attacks, people banded together to create the Guardians, a Maverick-fighting defense and investigation force. The group's original leader, Ciel, mysteriously disappeared after an investigation where she discovered a Biometal (a living artifact containing characteristics of someone who lived long ago) called "Model W", which turned her team into Mavericks. In response, Ciel created six new Biometals (based on X, Zero, and the Four Guardians of Neo Arcadia) to counter the growing threat.

Story 
A decade prior to the beginning of the story, Vent or Aile (depending on what gender the player chooses) loses his/her mother to a Maverick raid on an amusement park and becomes orphaned. He/she is taken in by Girouette (Giro for short in North America and Europe), the owner of Giro Express (Girouette Express in Japan), a delivery service. Giro is contacted by an unknown person to deliver a package containing Biometal Model X to a rendezvous point in a forest.

Vent/Aile and Giro are ambushed by Mavericks after meeting up. Vent/Aile escape the area while Giro covers their retreat. Here, he/she meets with Prairie, the leader of the Guardians, but their meeting is cut short when a Maverick attacks the group. Model X lends its strength to Vent/Aile, allowing him/her to "Megamerge" and transform into Mega Man Model X. With the help of Model X, the Maverick is destroyed. After finding Giro, in the form of Mega Man Model Z, they board an airship deemed the Guardian's headquarters. Later, a Maverick attack is spotted at the Slither Inc. main office. The duo meet the president of Slither Inc., Serpent, and his Reploid guardians, Prometheus and Pandora. Serpent reveals his knowledge of the Biometal and says that he's also a Mega Man, possessing Model W. He expresses his intent to find the Model W Core, and leaves, but not before possessing a weakened Giro with the power of Model W. A fight ensues, mortally wounding Giro. Giro hands Model Z over to Vent/Aile during his dying moments and transforms into a Cyber Elf. By "double mega-merging" with both Model X and Model Z, he/she uses the form Model ZX to escape. Now the Guardians, including Vent/Aile, must recover eight Biometal fragments and stop Serpent.

After finding four of eight Biometal pieces, the Guardian HQ comes under attack from Mavericks, led by Prometheus, with Vent/Aile aiding in the defenses. He/she succeeds in defeating Promethus before recovering the rest of the pieces. Upon retrieving all eight Biometal pieces and their passwords, Vent/Aile is able to enter a secret location and find Model W. However, Vent/Aile is stalled by Pandora and the Biometal is moved elsewhere. Later, Vent/Aile receive a signal from Model W, located at the Slither Inc. Head Office. Vent/Aile set off to destroy Model W.

After battling through Slither Inc., Vent/Aile face off against Serpent, who feeds the Model W core with several innocent Cyber Elves, and then fuses with it. Vent/Aile suddenly reverts to human due to the realization that the hatred of the Mavericks that he/she has kept inside his/her heart is the last thing needed to unleash Model W's full power, thus resulting in his/her temporary defeat. However, after gaining courage from the Biometals, he/she merges into Mega Man ZX and challenges Serpent to a final battle. During the battle, the tower collapses, destroying Model W and killing Serpent. Vent/Aile reunite with Prairie and the Guardians, and vow to continue to work for peace and justice.

Gameplay 
This game contains elements from both the Mega Man X series and the Mega Man Zero series. The players are on a 2-dimensional overlay map with sprites where they engage enemies to finish their mission. Missions are selected from a list, displayed on a computer. The player can freely explore the game world during and between missions, and they must find the specified area themselves.

During the game, the player can use Vent or Aile to transform into different forms using Bio-Metals whose appearance and abilities are based on X, Zero, and the Four Guardians from the Mega Man Zero series, the latter four where their abilities can be used to solve puzzles and obtain special items found in the stage and also use the Nintendo DS Dual-Screen feature for an additional ability as well. The Model X form is only available at the beginning of the game until Model ZX is acquired, but with a New Game Plus it will be available for the entire game. Additionally Omega from Mega Man Zero 3 appears as a hidden boss, alongside four "Mutos Reploids" from both Zero 3 (Blazin' Flizard, Childre Inarabitta, Hellbat Schilt, and Deathtanz Mantisk) and Mega Man Zero 4, (Pegasolta Eclair, Sol Titanion, Fenri Lunaedge, and Noble Mandrago) who all each occupy a hidden room which is only accessed by inserting the GBA cartridge of either game into the Nintendo DS or Nintendo DS Lite GBA slot. After defeating all eight Mutos Reploids, and Omega himself, the player will be able to acquire a hidden item, which will later enable the player to play as Omega after beating the game once and talking to one of the NPCs.

For the Mega Man Zero/ZX Legacy Collection release, the gameplay had received some minor updates, where the previous dual-screen features were placed in a small support screen which is positioned based on the setting the player chooses and the feature for unlocking the Mutos Reploids is now performed by a new Link Mode located in the main menu when accessing this game allows the player to face them by selecting either the Zero 3 or Zero 4 link to face against the 4 bosses from that respective game. The game also adds metroidvania concepts into the level design, with more exploration elements than the main Mega Man series.

Development 

News of a Mega Man game for the Nintendo DS first appeared on GameSpot, January 2006 on the same day that Capcom created an official teaser site. Capcom promised that this game would be a 2D side-scrolling action game with the ability to choose between a male character, Vent, or a female character, Aile.

A demo first appeared in Electronic Entertainment Expo (E3) 2006 at an unlabelled kiosk at the Capcom booth. Much of the main introductory plot was revealed and two in-game levels, Area H and Area E were playable. The controls were said to be "simple enough… yet challenging", but reviewers did see some slowdown.

Audio 
Rockman ZX Soundtrack -ZX Tunes- is the first remastered soundtrack album to be released for the Mega Man ZX series on October 27, 2006 by Inti Creates. The album consists of 2 Discs called Aile and Vent, named after the hero and the heroine of the game, and it is 131:37 minutes long. It also features one vocal track, Innocence, and five remix tracks.

Reception 

Mega Man ZX garnered positive reviews from most sources, garnering a Metacritic score of 76 out of 100. Similar to Mega Man Zero, Mega Man ZX was compared to the original Mega Man series. Its high level of difficulty was enjoyed by some, but criticized by others. Its gameplay presentation and level designs were praised. Low points in reviews were the confusing world map and frustrating difficulty level.

Mega Man ZX was the sixth-best-selling game in Japan during its release week at 33,652 units sold. 94,341 units of the game were sold in the region by the end of 2006. A direct sequel, Mega Man ZX Advent, was announced for release the following year.

Notes

References

External links 
 

 

2006 video games
Action video games
Inti Creates games
Metroidvania games
Nintendo DS games
Nintendo DS-only games
Side-scrolling platform games
Side-scrolling video games
Video games developed in Japan
Video games featuring female protagonists
Video games scored by Ippo Yamada
ZX